Anolis apollinaris, Boulenger's anole, is a species of lizard in the family Dactyloidae. The species is found in Colombia and Venezuela.

References

Anoles
Reptiles of Colombia
Reptiles of Venezuela
Reptiles described in 1919
Taxa named by George Albert Boulenger